A dropper or Pasteur pipette is an instrument used to transfer small quantities of liquid.

It may also refer to:
Dropper (malware), a program that tries to install malware
The Dropper, an album by experimental jazz fusion trio Medeski Martin & Wood
one of the participants in the drop swindle
an inhabitant of the "hippie commune" Drop City

See also
Nathan Kaplan (1891–1923), also known as "Kid Dropper" or "Jack the Dropper", American gangster
Garrett Droppers (1860–1927), American academic and diplomat